Emmanuele Kanyama (25 December 1962 – 17 February 2018) was a Roman Catholic bishop. 

Kanyama was ordained to the priesthood in 1990. He served as bishop of the Roman Catholic Diocese of Dedza, Malawi, from 2007 until his death.

Death
Kanyama died at his home in Kipiri, Mchinji District, Malawi on 17 February 2018 from complications of diabetes, at the age of 55.

Notes

1962 births
2018 deaths
21st-century Roman Catholic bishops in Malawi
Roman Catholic bishops of Dedza
Malawian clergy